The Ruler class of escort aircraft carriers served with the Royal Navy during the Second World War. All twenty-three ships were built by the Seattle-Tacoma Shipbuilding Corporation in the United States as Bogue-class escort carriers, supplied under Lend-Lease to the United Kingdom. They were the most numerous single class of aircraft carriers in service with the Royal Navy.

As built they were intended for three types of operations, "Assault" or strike, convoy escort, or aircraft ferry.

After the war some were scrapped while other had their flight deck removed and converted as merchant vessels (and all eventually scrapped by the 1970s).

Design and description
These ships were all larger and had greater aircraft capacity than all preceding American built escort carriers. They were laid down as escort carriers and were not converted merchant ships.

Armament comprised: two 4 inch Dual Purpose guns in single mounts, sixteen 40 mm Bofors anti-aircraft guns in twin mounts and twenty 20 mm Oerlikon anti-aircraft cannons in single mounts. They had a maximum aircraft capacity of twenty-four aircraft which could be a mixture of Grumman Martlet, Vought F4U Corsair or Hawker Sea Hurricane fighter aircraft and Fairey Swordfish torpedo bomber or Grumman Avenger anti-submarine aircraft.

Ships

First group

 (crewed by the Royal Canadian Navy)

 X
 XX

 X

Second group

 XX
 X
 X
 XX

 X
 X (crewed by the Royal Canadian Navy) (torpedoed 22 August 1944, by U-354 west of the North Cape)
 X
 X

 XX
 X
 (torpedoed 15 January 1945, by U-1172 in the Clyde estuary).

X = Fitted for anti-submarine warfare.
XX = Fitted for strike-operations.
All the others were mainly used for aircraft transport with an added strike capability.

Notes

Bibliography

Escort aircraft carrier classes